Khar Lake may refer to:

 Khar Lake (Khovd)
 Khar Lake (Zavkhan)